Rose Marie Muraro (Rio de Janeiro, November 11, 1930 – Rio de Janeiro, June 21, 2014) was a Brazilian sociologist, writer, intellectual and feminist. Born nearly blind, she was the author of over 40 books and also served as publisher and director of Vozes.

Biography 
Muraro studied physics and economics, before becoming a writer and editor. She also spoke different languages and studied mathematics. She published controversial books, challenging modern social values. After editing Vozes, she became the editor of Espaço &Tempo (1986-1988), Rosa dos Tempos (1989-1998) and, Editora Record.

Muraro was a prominent figure in the development of the feminist movement in Brazil. Like other authors such as Carmen da Silva, Heloneida Studart, and Heleieth Saffioti, Muraro was considered part of the first-wave Brazilian feminists, who started addressing women's condition in their works. She began advocating for gender equality in 1967 with the publication of her book Libertecao sexual da muher. Early in her career, however, she did not label herself a feminist and would only embrace it when she became the editor of the publishing house Vozes. This has been attributed to the negative connotation of the nascent feminism in Brazil. An account noted that the Brazilian feminism positioned itself self-consciously in relation to the politics of public and private spheres. 

Muraro was also a proponent of Liberation Theology. She was a founding member the movement, which was established by the theologian Leonardo Boff. She was fielded as candidate of the PDT and PT political parties.  

Muraro wrote her memoir in 1999. It is said that her creative writing students at Temple University prompted her to write about her life. She died in 2014 of bone marrow cancer.

Partial works

References

1930 births
2014 deaths
Writers from Rio de Janeiro (city)
20th-century Brazilian women writers
Brazilian non-fiction writers
Brazilian feminist writers
Brazilian sociologists
Women memoirists
Deaths from bone cancer
Deaths from multiple myeloma
21st-century Brazilian women writers
21st-century Brazilian writers